Sella is a village in the municipal unit of Rio, Achaea, Greece. It is located in the northern foothills of the Panachaiko, at 500 m above sea level. The river Volinaios flows east and north of the village. It is 2 km east of Argyra and 9 km east of Rio. In 2011, it had a population of 302.

Population

See also

List of settlements in Achaea

External links
Sella at the GTP Travel Pages

References

Rio, Greece
Populated places in Achaea